The 2002 Slough Borough Council election was held on 2 May 2002, at the same time as other local elections across England. Fourteen of the 41 seats on Slough Borough Council were up for election, being the usual third of the council (13 seats) plus a by-election in Stoke ward, following the death of Liberal councillor James Moore.

Results
The results were:

Baggi Sandhu had formerly served as a councillor 1996–1997.

Sean Wright was a member of the Britwellian, Independent, Liberal and Liberal Democrat Group (BILLD). When the Britwellian party split later in 2002, Sean Wright joined the Independent Britwellian Residents party.

Lydia Simmons had formerly served as a councillor 1979–1994.

Dave Mansell had formerly served as a councillor 1983–1990.

Jean Stockton was a member of the Britwellian, Independent, Liberal and Liberal Democrat Group (BILLD) and had formerly served as a councillor 1992–1997.

Egbert Thomas was elected to fill the vacancy caused by the death of Liberal councillor James Moore, and so was only elected to serve until James Moore's term of office would have otherwise expired in 2003.

David MacIsaac was a member of the Britwellian, Independent, Liberal and Liberal Democrat Group (BILLD).

By-election results 2002-2003

By-election caused by death of Mavis L. Gallick (Britwellian).

By-election caused by death of Dennis McCarthy (Labour).

References

Slough
Slough Borough Council elections